Hriday Haran B.A. Pass is an Indian Bengali-language comedy-drama television series that premiered on 13 August 2018. The series was broadcast on the Bengali television channel Zee Bangla, and streamed on the digital platform ZEE5. Produced by Blues Productions, the show stars, movie star Joey Debroy as the protagonist of the show and for the first time on television show. Roshni Tanwi Bhattacharya in lead roles and Goutam De, Jayant Dutt Barman and Siddhartha Bandyopadhyay in supporting roles. The show is written by Snehasish Chakroborty, known for Khokababu, Jarowar Jhumko, Tumi Robe Nirobe, and Rakhi Bandhan.

Plot
The story revolves around a young couple, Hridoy and Pekham. Hriday as he is referred to, is the black sheep of the family - unemployed and uneducated - only interested in music. Hriday then makes the ultimate sacrifice, leaves his career as a lyricist and becomes a driver at Pekham's house. Pekhem is a smart but difficult to manage girl. She happens to be a great fan of singer Sid and later fall in love with him. Pekham's father arranges his daughter's marriage with a man who is simple, traditional and homely. But Pekhem runaway on her wedding day with the help of driver Hriday to marry her long time boyfriend singer Sid. But both Hridoy and Pekham's families think that Hriday enlopes Pekhem to marry her and they disown them for this mistake, the couple is forced to live in a boarding house with bachelors.

Cast
Joey Debroy as Hridayharan/ Sreemodhayam
Roshni Tanwi Bhattacharya as Pekhom
Indrakshi Dey as Deepika
Goutam De as Hriday 's Father 
Bimal Chakraborty as Pekhom's Father
Suchismita Chowdhury as Pekhom's mother/Kadombori
Sargami Rumpa as Palak/Pekhom's Sister
Diya Basu as Pekhom's Cousin 
Sourav Banerjee as Pekhom's Cousin
Ratna Ghoshal as Pekhom's grandmother 
Srabanti Malakar as Pekhom's aunt
Arun Saha as Mosaheb/Pekhom's Father's Secretary
Siddhartha Bandyopadhyay as Hriday 's Brother
Sayantani Majumdar as Hriday's Sister-in-law
Jayanta Dutta Barman as Hriday's Brother 
Arpita Dutta Chowdhury as Hriday's sister-in-law
Manoj Ojha as Shyamacharan
Mafin Chakraborty as Payel
Kanchana Maitra as Bina
Ritu Rai Acharya as Gongur
Piyali Mukherjee as Piyali
Maitreyee Ghatak as Jipsi
Monalisa Das as Jonaki
Soumik Saha as Palak's husband
Dwaipayan Chakraborty as Sid
Soma Banerjee as Sid's mother

References

External links 
 Official Website

2018 Indian television series debuts
Bengali-language television programming in India
Indian drama television series
Zee Bangla original programming